Catellani is an Italian surname. Notable people with the surname include:

Andrea Catellani (born 1988), Italian footballer
Sauro Catellani (born 1953), Italian footballer

See also
Catellani reaction, a chemical reaction

Italian-language surnames